Ramón Franco Bahamonde (2 February 1896 – 28 October 1938), was a Spanish pioneer of aviation, a political figure and brother of later caudillo Francisco Franco. Well before the Spanish Civil War, during the reign of Alfonso XIII, both brothers were acclaimed as national heroes in Spain; however, the two had strongly differing political views. Although, with the "Ley de Unidad Sindical" of 26 January 1940, his brother Francisco Franco realized many of the syndicalist political ideals of Ramón Franco. This syndicate law was unique in Europe and brought Spain a high level of social welfare, housing and labour protection without the high costs of social conflict between stakeholders that normally accompanied such social advancements in other countries. They had a less-known brother, Nicolás.

Aviator

Ramón started his career as an ordinary successful military officer in the infantry, assigned to Morocco in 1914. In 1920 he joined the Spanish Air Force, participating in activities that earned him international attention. Promoted major, in 1926 he became a national hero when he piloted the Plus Ultra flying boat on a transatlantic flight. His co-pilot was Julio Ruiz de Alda Miqueleiz; the other crew members were Teniente de Navio (Navy Lieutenant) Juan Manuel Duran and the mechanic Pablo Rada. The Plus Ultra departed from Palos de la Frontera, in Huelva, Spain on 22 January and arrived in Buenos Aires, Argentina on 26 January. It stopped over at Gran Canaria, Cape Verde, Pernambuco, Rio de Janeiro and Montevideo. The 10,270 km journey was completed in 59 hours and 39 minutes.

The event appeared in most of the major newspapers worldwide. Throughout the Spanish-speaking world the Spanish aviators were glamorously acclaimed, particularly in Argentina and Spain where thousands gathered at Christopher Columbus square in Madrid. 

In 1929, he attempted another trans-Atlantic flight, this time crashing the airplane to the sea. The crew was rescued days later by an aircraft carrier of the British Royal Navy.

Political activism
During the reign of Miguel Primo de Rivera he declared himself on several occasions against the regime. He conspired against the Monarchy, inflicted losses on the army and was sent to prison, from which he was able to escape.  In December 1930, along with other Republican aviators, he seized some aircraft at the aerodrome of Cuatro Vientos and flew over Madrid dropping leaflets which falsely stated a republican revolution had broken out all over Spain, calling on citizens and soldiers to aid the movement and stating that troops' quarters would be bombed shortly if they did not help in the revolution. He fled to Portugal and returned to Spain when the Second Spanish Republic was proclaimed.

Reentering the Army, he was named chief of a main directorate of Aeronautics, a position from which he was dismissed shortly afterwards for his participation in an anarchist revolt in Andalusia. He was elected as a deputy in the Cortes for Republican Left of Catalonia in Barcelona, retiring from the army and focused on politics.

Civil War
When the Spanish Civil War exploded in July 1936, he was in the United States as an air attaché of the Spanish Embassy.

Upon his return to Spain, in spite of his leftist political past, he joined the Nationalist side, of which his brother Francisco was a main leader. He was promoted to Lieutenant Colonel and was named head of the airbase at Majorca. His receipt of the command in Majorca was "received very badly" by his fellow aviators, who resented that Ramón, a Freemason who had been dismissed, had been promoted over officers with war merits.

Death
Ramón Franco was killed in an air accident on 28 October 1938, when his seaplane crashed off Pollença, near the coast of Majorca, while attempting to bomb Republican-controlled Valencia.  His body was found floating in the water and his death led to rumors of conspiracies and sabotage. According to his sister, he was murdered by Freemasonry who loaded bricks and motor aboard his plane because he wanted to publish an anti-Masonic book called La burla del grado 33. Following the crash his brother Francisco, who would rule Spain for the next three decades, severed most relations with his brother's widow and daughter.

References

External links

 El vuelo del Plus Ultra, in Spanish.
 A picture of Franco at the Plus Ultra celebrations in Ferrol and Madrid (1926)
 Traveller's Guide of Europe: Ferrol c. 1919
 Dornier Wal, in Spanish.
 

1896 births
1938 deaths
People from Ferrol, Spain
Republican Left of Catalonia politicians
Members of the Congress of Deputies of the Second Spanish Republic
Spanish aviators
History of the Spanish Air Force
Transatlantic flight
Spanish Freemasons
Spanish military personnel of the Spanish Civil War (National faction)
Aviators killed in aviation accidents or incidents in Spain
Military personnel killed in the Spanish Civil War
Aviation pioneers
Air attachés
Victims of aviation accidents or incidents in 1938